National Medical & Dental College Admission Test (NMDCAT) (or National MDCAT) is a pen-and-paper based test conducted in Pakistan and internationally each year for those who want to pursue undergraduate medical and dental education in Pakistan. It is a pre-requisite for admission in all medical and dental colleges (both public and private) in Pakistan.

NMDCAT is conducted annually by the Pakistan Medical Commission. In 2020, the test replaced the provincial medical entrance exams conducted in the past.

History 
Provincial medical entrance exams included the MDCAT conducted by the University of Health Sciences, Lahore in Punjab and Balochistan before the NMDCAT. It was implemented in 1998 as the Medical College Admission Test (MCAT) on the initiative of the then chief minister of Punjab Mian Muhammad Shahbaz Sharif to counter replete cheating in HSSC exams at the time. Other provinces also started conducting their medical entrance exams in the years to follow. From 1998 to 2007, it was conducted by the King Edward Medical University, Lahore. From 2008, University of Health Sciences, Lahore conducted the test in Punjab. Initially, Institute of Business Administration used to conduct separate Entry Tests for MBBS and BDS courses in public colleges of Sindh under the provincial government. Later, National Testing Service (NTS) started to conduct the tests. After the PMDC regulations were amended in 2016, NTS started to conduct a centralized Entry Test for public and private medical and dental colleges in Sindh. Educational Testing and Evaluation Agency (ETEA) used to conduct the provincial medical entrance exam before the NMDCAT in Khyber Pakhtunkhwa. After the PMDC was dissolved by the federal government in 2020 and Pakistan Medical Commission was introduced, the NMDCAT was introduced. Over 125,000 students registered for the NMDCAT from all over the country.

For the first time, in 2021, the test was computerized and conducted internationally through a local testing service. In 2022, the mode of examination shifted back to pen-and-paper based and provinces were given the authority to conduct the exam through their respective Admitting Universities.

Seat distribution 
The seats are limited as there are some 3405 seats for admissions solely based on previous academic record (locally called open merit format) in public medical colleges and some 216 open merit seats in public dental colleges of Punjab only. In addition, some seats are reserved for foreign and dual nationality holders. There are also 76 seats for overseas Pakistanis. Overseas Pakistanis are not charged higher tuition fee as opposed to foreign nationals who pay around $10,000 per year, which is often far less compared to many institutes in other parts of the world.

Test structure and scoring 
NMDCAT consists of multiple choice questions. Each question carries 1 mark with no negative marking for wrong answers. Total score is 200. 68 questions are from Biology, 54 from Chemistry, 54 from Physics, 18 from English language, 6 from Logical reasoning.

Only in 2021 the total score was increased to 210. The next year the score was back to 200.

Syllabus 
The syllabus for the exam is available on the website of Pakistan Medical Commission. It is claimed by the organization that it follows a common curriculum of HSSC. It consists of Biology, Chemistry, Physics, English language and Logical reasoning.

Conducting body 
Pakistan Medical Commission, regulator of medical education in Pakistan, conducts the entrance exam.

Reliability 
The results of the NMDCAT 2020 were announced on December 16, 2020. The exam achieved a 0.96 on Cronbach's alpha and was determined to be extremely reliable and consistent with its structure and objectives.

Controversies 
In 2001, IBA received heavy criticism as its reputation was largely undermined when a massive fraud was found in the Entry Test conducted by Sindh government.

Medical admissions in Pakistan received for the 20 additional marks given to students who have memorized the Quran. These additional marks sometimes prevent non-Muslim students from getting onto the merit list. In 2012, a Christian student went to Lahore High Court because he couldn't get onto the merit list while his Muslim peers with less marks were on the merit list with the additional 20 marks. However, his plea was dismissed by the Lahore High Court.

In 2020, the date of the NMDCAT clashed with the Hindu festival of Diwali. The Hindu students and activists protested against it. The Hindu civil rights activist Kapil Dev said, “If you don't schedule exams on your Eid, how come you schedule it on Diwali?". However, despite these protests, the Pakistan Medical Commission refused to change the date of NMDCAT.

Protests started in Punjab as the syllabus released by PMC included out of syllabus topics of UHS despite the syllabi from the Admitting Universities already being released in accordance with the now defunct PMDC Regulations, 2020. PUMHSW (the Admitting University of Sindh as per the defunct PMDC Regulations, 2020) had also announced the date of Entry Test in Sindh and the National Testing Service had also issued the admit cards in accordance with the directives by Government of Sindh. Sindh government heavily criticised the federal government on introducing a centralized test for admissions and did not allow them to conduct NMDCAT in Sindh. However, it was on November 11, 2020, the Entry Test was cancelled by the Sindh High Court and the NMDCAT by PMC was declared legal and constitutional. It led to chaos and confusion among students from all over the country as the provincial entrance exams were cancelled only two weeks before and a centralized medical entrance exam came into existence for the first time. On November 11, 2020, the NMDCAT was delayed by Sindh High Court as key bodies weren't formed by the PMC in order to structure the syllabus and the date. After the formation of National Medical and Dental Academic Board, the Pakistan Medical Commission approved the syllabus and conducted the NMDCAT on November 29, 2020. After it was conducted, the test was heavily criticised by all provinces as it was alleged the content was out of provincial syllabi. It led to Sindh government rejecting the NMDCAT. After the results were announced, protests over the alleged discrepancies in the results took place all over the country which led to PMC giving the option of recounting. In 2021, the computerized MDCAT received heavy criticism due to alleged discrepancies in the way it was conducted.

See also 
 ECAT Pakistan
 National Testing Service
 Graduate Assessment Test
 Inter Services Selection Board

References 

Standardised tests in Pakistan
Entrance examinations